Christophe may refer to:

People
 Christophe (given name), list of people with this name

 Christophe (singer) (1945–2020), French singer
 Cristophe (hairstylist) (born 1958), Belgian hairstylist
 Georges Colomb (1856–1945), French comic strip artist and botanist who published under the pseudonym Christophe

People with the surname Christophe
 Didier Christophe (born 1956), retired professional French footballer, managing Pau FC
 Henri Christophe (1767–1820), Haitian Revolution leader

Other uses
 Christophe (Amsterdam), restaurant in Amsterdam, The Netherlands
 1698 Christophe, asteroid

Surnames from given names